Phosphatidylinositol 4-kinase alpha is an enzyme that in humans is encoded by the PI4KA gene.

Function 

This gene encodes a 1-phosphatidylinositol 4-kinase which catalyzes the first committed step in the biosynthesis of phosphatidylinositol 4,5-bisphosphate. The mammalian PI 4-kinases have been classified into two types, II and III, based on their molecular mass, and modulation by detergent and adenosine. Two transcript variants encoding different isoforms have been described for this gene.

Clinical significance 

The alpha isoform of PI4KIII plays a role in replication of hepatitis C virus (HCV). Furthermore, the PI4KA lipid kinase affects HCV replication by altering phosphorylation of the HCV NS5A protein.

References

Further reading

EC 2.7.1